{{Infobox military person
|honorific_prefix= 
|name=Frederick Paul Irby
|honorific_suffix=
|birth_date=
|death_date=
|birth_place=
|death_place=Boyland Hall, near Norwich<ref name=AR>The Annual Register, or a View of the History and Politics of the Year 1844, F & J Rivington, London, 1845</ref>
|image=Frederick Paul Irby.jpg
|image_size=175
|caption=Captain The Hon. Frederick Paul Irby, by S J Rochard, 1822.
|nickname=
|allegiance=
|serviceyears=1791 - 1844
|rank=Rear-Admiral
|branch=
|commands=

|battles=

|awards=Companion of the Order of the Bath
|laterwork=MagistrateDeputy Lord Lieutenant of Norfolk
}}

Rear Admiral Frederick Paul Irby  (18 April 1779 – 24 April 1844) was a British Royal Navy officer and Deputy Lord Lieutenant of Norfolk.

Birth

Frederick Irby was born on 18 April 1779, the second son of Frederick, 2nd Baron Boston and his wife Christian (née Methuen).

Early Royal Naval career

He entered the Royal Navy on 2 January 1791, serving on the Home and North America and West Indies Stations.  As a midshipman in HMS Montagu he was present at the Glorious First of June in 1794.  On 6 June 1797 he was promoted lieutenant and appointed to HMS Circe, in which he was present at the Battle of Camperdown. He was wrecked off the Texel in HMS Apollo on 7 January 1799.  Promoted to commander on 22 April 1800, he became the captain of HMS Volcano, a bomb vessel, moving in 1801 to HMS Jalouse operating in the North Sea.Jalouse, while under his command, was instrumental in saving  when she was driven ashore on the coast of Holland. Irby's youngest brother, Charles Leonard Irby, was a midshipman on board Narcissus, having joined her on 23 May.

Post captain

Promoted post-captain on 14 April 1802, he appears to have been placed on half pay.  He married Emily Ives Drake, sister of Lady Boston (and hence his sister-in-law), on 1 December 1803.  He was appointed in command of a unit of the Sea Fencibles in the Essex District in 1805, and on 7 August 1807 his wife died giving birth to a son.  He returned to sea to command HMS Amelia in December 1807, serving under Rear Admiral Stopford on the Home Station.  On 24 February 1809 he took part in the Battle of Les Sables-d'Olonne, which drove three large French frigates aground and destroyed them, gaining the special approval of the Admiralty. In 1811, in company with HMS Berwick and HMS Niobe, he destroyed the French frigate Amazone near Barfleur. He became the senior officer on the West Africa Squadron later in 1811. The Action of 7 February 1813 between Amelia'' and the French frigate Aréthuse ended his naval career. Captain Irby was seriously wounded and after 1813 he saw no further active service. The seventh report (1813) of the African Institution expressed the organization's gratitude for Irby's efforts in reducing the slave trade.

Later life

He settled in Norfolk, at Boyland Hall, near Norwich, and on 23 January 1816 he married his second wife, Frances Wright. They had three sons and four daughters, including Leonard Howard Lloyd Irby, a famous ornithologist, and Paulina Irby, a revered hero of Bosnia. In 1831 he was appointed Companion of the Order of the Bath (CB) and in 1837 promoted to rear admiral. He served as a Magistrate and Deputy Lord Lieutenant of Norfolk, and died on 24 April 1844 aged 65.

Notes

References

Attribution:

1779 births
1844 deaths
Royal Navy rear admirals
People from Morningthorpe
Royal Navy personnel of the French Revolutionary Wars
Royal Navy personnel of the Napoleonic Wars
Companions of the Order of the Bath
Deputy Lieutenants of Norfolk
Officers of the West Africa Squadron
Younger sons of barons